Durangona is a genus of cicadas in the family Cicadidae and the monotypic tribe Durangonini, found in South America.

Species
BioLib includes the following described species:
 Durangona exechopyga Sanborn, 2020
 Durangona tigrina Distant, 1911

References

Further reading

 
 
 
 
 
 
 
 
 

Chlorocystini
Cicadidae genera